Bradyrrhoa adrianae is a species of snout moth in the genus Bradyrrhoa. It was described by Jan Asselbergs in 2002 and is known from Spain.

References

Phycitini
Moths described in 2002